The Village of the Arts is located in Bradenton, Florida. Area residents live alongside the artists. Many galleries/studios in this area are also homes, making this restored section of Bradenton unique with its many artists-in-residence.

Village area
This area of Bradenton originally consisted of 1920s style architecture.
From May 31, 1937 until  the site was home to the Bradenton General Hospital.

Some of the buildings used for galleries and homes are as old as 100 years.

Live-work space
The Village is a diverse collection of artists, galleries and fine food. Artisians from the Village of the Arts received regulatory relief from the city of Bradenton allowing artist-in-residences to live and work out of their homes. At one time, the houses in this area of Bradenton were considered dilapidated and an eyesore. Most have been restored, painted in colorful hues and pastels, and converted into workshops, studios, medical facilities, family activities, galleries and cafes.

Artistic media
Village artists practice their craft in the following areas:

Goldsmithing, Silversmithing, stained glass, altered books, copper-pigment work, assemblage, collage, oil-painting, quilting, acrylic painting, fiber art, mixed media, encaustic painting, fashion and custom clothing, antiques and their restoration, sculpture, drawing, photography, book-selling, basket-weaving, re-cycled and up-cycled art, botanical objects, mosaic, clay, pottery, music instruction and performance, art instruction, watercolors, dichroic glass, woodcarving, jewelry, cut and polished stone work, metal working and many more.

Many artisans accept commissions, i.e., work as ordered and designed by a patron/customer. Patrons are able to become involved in the production of a piece that meets the needs of a specific space in their home or office.

See also
Artist-run initiative
Artist-run space
National Cooperative Business Association

References

External links

 

American artist groups and collectives
Art museums and galleries in Florida
Tourist attractions in Manatee County, Florida
Bradenton, Florida
Arts centers in Florida
Art gallery districts
Arts districts